Lieutenant-Colonel Henry Byrde was the 2nd Commander of the Ceylon Volunteers. He was appointed on 28 August 1893 until 13 May 1896. He was succeeded by A. F. C. Vincent.

References

Commanders of the Ceylon Defence Force
57th Regiment of Foot officers